Montemilone is a town and comune in the province of Potenza,  Basilicata, southern Italy.

Main sights

Sanctuary of the Gloriosa, a small church in Romanesque style
Former church of the Purgatory
Mother church (1861)

References

Cities and towns in Basilicata